Buell Patrick Abbott (January 18, 1912 – 1984) was an American professional golfer. 

Abbott was born in Pasadena, California. In 1936, he won the U.S. Amateur Public Links, beating Claude Rippy 4 & 3. In 1938, he lost the U.S. Amateur to Willie Turnesa 8 & 7. He would lose the U.S. Amateur again in 1941 to Bud Ward 4 & 3. He won the 1942 Western Amateur as well as the Southern California Amateur, twice, and the Southern California Open in 1935.

Abbott turned professional after World War II and served as a club pro at Memphis Country Club in Memphis, Tennessee for 34 years. He won the Tennessee Open four times and the Tennessee PGA Senior Championship three times. 

Abbott was inducted into the Tennessee Golf Hall of Fame in 2002.

Amateur wins (4)
1936 U.S. Amateur Public Links
1938 Southern California Amateur
1941 Southern California Amateur
1942 Western Amateur

Professional wins (8)
1935 Southern California Open (as an amateur)
1949 Tennessee Open
1954 Tennessee Open
1955 Tennessee Open
1962 Tennessee Open
1969 Tennessee PGA Senior Championship
1971 Tennessee PGA Senior Championship
1974 Tennessee PGA Senior Championship

References

External links
Tennessee Golf Hall of Fame profile

American male golfers
Golfers from California
Golfers from Memphis, Tennessee
Sportspeople from Pasadena, California
1912 births
1984 deaths